The state anthem of the Sakha Republic is the regional anthem of the Sakha Republic, a federal subject of Russia. It is one of the official symbols of the Sakha Republic, along with the flag and the coat of arms of the Sakha Republic. It was originally written in the Yakut language by Savva Tarasov and Mikhail Timofeyev. The anthem was translated into Russian by Vladimir Fedorov. The music was composed by Kirill Gerasimov. It was officially adopted on 15 July 2004. The anthem's music is played in F major.

Background

Creation 
After the Sakha Republic became a separate constituent state of Russia, its constitution was adopted. At that time, no regional anthem of the Sakha Republic existed. The constitution only stipulates that:

After the approval of the new constitution, a commission for the creation of the national anthem was formed, with the poet Savva Tarasov as the chairman. A competition for the national anthem was announced. Hundreds of submission for the national anthem was received from throughout the country, but the commission did not approved any of the submission. This caused Savva Tarasov to be replaced from her position in September 1992 by the Deputy Chairman of the Government of the Republic of Sakha, K. Koryakin.

After this failure, the president of the Sakha Republic, Mikhail Nikolayev, entrusted the Ministry of Culture of the Sakha Republic, to continue the search for the anthem. In September 1995, at a meeting of the State Assembly of the Sakha Republic, a proposed anthem was presented. The lyrics of the proposed anthem was written by Dmitry Sivtsev. The music of the anthem was based on the final chorus from the opera Nyurgun Bootur, which was composed by Mark Zhirkov and Heinrich Litinsky, and was re-arranged by Y. Sheykina.

In 2000, a new commission was formed under the leadership of the People's Deputy G. G. Mestnikov. The commission presented a new version of the anthem, titled "" ("Song of the Footman"). The lyrics was written by Savva Tarasov and Mikhail Tarasov, and the music was composed by Kirill Gerasimov.

Approval 
On 26 March 2003, the President of the Sakha Republic, Vyacheslav Shtyrov, issued a decree to form a new commission to prepare the issue of the anthem, under the leadership of E.S. Nikitina. The commission chooses the work "" and recommended the work to be submitted to the State Assembly of the Sakha Republic. On 15 July 2004, the national anthem was approved by the State Assembly.

On 27 April 2004 the first official performance of the anthem took place on the Day of the Republic.

Previous anthems

"Sargılardaaq saqalarbıt" 
The song "" ("Sakha, Covered in Happiness") was adopted as the anthem of the Tungus Republic. The anthem itself was composed by Adam Skryabin, and the lyrics of the song was based on the poem "" by Alampa. The poem itself was written in 1917.

The Internationale 

The "Internationale" (Novgorodov alphabet: Internessijene:l), was the national anthem of the Union of Soviet Socialist Republics (USSR) and the state anthem of the Russian Soviet Federative Socialist Republic from 1922 to 1944.

The Yakut translation of the anthem was planned to be written by Semyon Novgorodov. Unfortunately, due to his nescience of the lyrics of the anthem, he handed over the task to Platon Oyunsky. It was finished on 7 December 1921. The translation was first published in the "Lena Commune" newspaper on 15 December 1921.

State Anthem of the Soviet Union 

The "State Anthem of the Soviet Union", was the official national anthem of the Union of Soviet Socialist Republics (USSR) and the state anthem of the Russian Soviet Federative Socialist Republic from 1944 to 1991, replacing "The Internationale".

Usage of the anthem in Yakut ASSR 
After the creation of this anthem, the anthem itself was popularized all over the Soviet Union. In the Yakut ASSR, the Yakut Regional Committee of the CPSU ordered all district and city committees to organize the popularization of the anthem with the help of newspapers, radio, and the creation of study groups for the lyrics of the song, including in the Yakut language.

The Council of People's Commissars of the Yakut ASSR also ordered the Radio Committee to record the Yakut version of the anthem and systematically broadcast it. A total of 15,000 copies of the lyrics were published and sent out on colorful flyers.

Yakut translation of the anthem 
The official translation of the anthem in Yakut was approved through a special commission. The commission consisted of the head of the APO of the Yakut regional committee Zakharov, People's Commissar of Education Chemezov, historian G.P. Basharin and composer Mark Zhirkov.

The commission received nine submission of translations from all over the Yakut ASSR. Of all the lyrics submitted, only the lyrics by Nikolai Egorovich Mordinov and poet Sergey Stepanovich Vasilyev was selected. Both were instructed to combine both translation and polish them on January 12, 1944. The final translation was approved by the Presidium of the Supreme Soviet of the USSR on 26 June 1944.

"Saqa ırıata" 
The song "" ("Sakha Song") was originally a poem written by Alampa in 1919. The poem was musicalized by Adam Skryabin.

The song became a symbol of resistance against Soviet rule in the Yakut region from 1921 until 1923, so much that the writer of the poem, Alampa, was labelled as a "nationalist-bourgeoisie". Alampa was sent to the Solovki prison camp after his arrest. The composer of the song, Adam Skryabin, went abroad to evade the persecution and was given trial in absentia.

After a long time, the song was allowed by the Soviet government to be performed publicly. The first public performance of this song was in the Victory Day celebration in the Yakut ASSR in 1945, from a gramophone record. The song was proposed to become the anthem of the Sakha Republic in 1990.

Lyrics 
Lyrics are official in both Yakut and Russian languages, along with a singable English translation.

Yakut version

Russian version

English version

External links
 Lyrics of the Anthem in Sakha
 Lyrics of the Anthem is Russian
 Sheet music for the anthem with Sakha lyrics

Notes

References

Citations

Bibliography 

Sakha
Sakha Republic
Regional songs
National anthem compositions in F major